Five Points is a census-designated place (CDP) in Columbia County, Florida, United States. The population was 1,265 at the 2010 census.

Geography

Demographics

As of the census of 2000, there were 1,362 people, 417 households, and 266 families residing in the CDP. The racial makeup of the CDP was 82.75% White, 15.71% Black, 0.22% American Indian, 0.22% Asian, 0.22% from other races, and 0.88% from two or more races. Hispanic or Latino of any race were 1.91% of the population.

There were 417 households, out of which 30.5% had children under the age of 18 living with them, 36.9% were married couples living together, 22.1% had a female householder with no husband present, and 36.2% were non-families. 28.1% of all households were made up of individuals, and 9.8% had someone living alone who was 65 years of age or older.  The average household size was 2.56 and the average family size was 3.11.

In the CDP, the population was spread out, with 23.1% under the age of 18, 13.5% from 18 to 24, 36.1% from 25 to 44, 18.8% from 45 to 64, and 8.4% who were 65 years of age or older.  The median age was 32 years. For every 100 females, there were 138.1 males.  For every 100 females age 18 and over, there were 141.8 males.

The median income for a household in the CDP was $15,057, and the median income for a family was $15,375. Males had a median income of $17,446 versus $11,964 for females. The per capita income for the CDP was $6,246.  About 30.7% of families and 43.8% of the population were below the poverty line, including 67.6% of those under age 18 and 8.8% of those age 65 or over.

References

Census-designated places in Columbia County, Florida
Census-designated places in Florida